Ctenognathus is a genus of beetles in the family Carabidae. This genus is endemic to New Zealand. It was first described by Léon Fairmaire in 1843.

Species 
Ctenognathus contains the following twenty-five species:

 Ctenognathus adamsi (Broun, 1886)
 Ctenognathus arnaudensis (Broun, 1921)
 Ctenognathus cardiophorus (Chaudoir, 1878)
 Ctenognathus colensonis (White, 1846)
 Ctenognathus davidsoni Larochelle & Larivière, 2021
 Ctenognathus earlyi Larochelle & Larivière, 2021
 Ctenognathus edwardsii (Bates, 1874)
 Ctenognathus elevatus (White, 1846)
 Ctenognathus garnerae Larochelle & Larivière, 2021
 Ctenognathus helmsi (Sharp, 1881)
 Ctenognathus hoarei Larochelle & Larivière, 2021
 Ctenognathus intermedius (Broun, 1908)
 Ctenognathus kaikoura Larochelle & Larivière, 2021
 Ctenognathus marieclaudiae Larochelle, 2021
 Ctenognathus novaezelandiae (Fairmaire, 1843)
 Ctenognathus oreobius (Broun, 1886)
 Ctenognathus otagoensis (Bates, 1878)
 Ctenognathus perumalae Larochelle & Larivière, 2021
 Ctenognathus pictonensis Sharp, 1886
 Ctenognathus sandageri (Broun, 1882)
 Ctenognathus takahe Larochelle & Larivière, 2021
 Ctenognathus tawanui Larochelle & Larivière, 2021
 Ctenognathus tepaki Larochelle & Larivière, 2021
 Ctenognathus urewera Larochelle & Larivière, 2021
 Ctenognathus xanthomelas (Broun, 1908)

References

Platyninae
Beetles of New Zealand
Endemic fauna of New Zealand
Endemic insects of New Zealand